In geometry, chamfering or edge-truncation is a topological operator that modifies one polyhedron into another. It is similar to expansion, moving faces apart and outward, but also maintains the original vertices. For polyhedra, this operation adds a new hexagonal face in place of each original edge. 

In Conway polyhedron notation it is represented by the letter . A polyhedron with  edges will have a chamfered form containing  new vertices,  new edges, and  new hexagonal faces.

Chamfered Platonic solids

In the chapters below the chamfers of the five Platonic solids are described in detail. Each is shown in a version with edges of equal length and in a canonical version where all edges touch the same midsphere. (They only look noticeably different for solids containing triangles.) The shown duals are dual to the canonical versions.

Chamfered tetrahedron

The chamfered tetrahedron (or alternate truncated cube) is a convex polyhedron constructed as an alternately truncated cube or chamfer operation on a tetrahedron, replacing its 6 edges with hexagons.

It is the Goldberg polyhedron GIII(2,0), containing triangular and hexagonal faces.

Chamfered cube

The chamfered cube is a convex polyhedron with 32 vertices, 48 edges, and 18 faces: 12 hexagons and 6 squares. It is constructed as a chamfer of a cube. The squares are reduced in size and new hexagonal faces are added in place of all the original edges. Its dual is the tetrakis cuboctahedron.

It is also inaccurately called a truncated rhombic dodecahedron, although that name rather suggests a rhombicuboctahedron. It can more accurately be called a tetratruncated rhombic dodecahedron because only the order-4 vertices are truncated.

The hexagonal faces are equilateral but not regular. They are formed by a truncated rhombus, have 2 internal angles of about 109.47°  and 4 internal angles of about 125.26°, while a regular hexagon would have all 120° angles.

Because all its faces have an even number of sides with 180° rotation symmetry, it is a zonohedron. It is also the Goldberg polyhedron GPIV(2,0) or {4+,3}2,0, containing square and hexagonal faces.

A topological equivalent with pyritohedral symmetry and rectangular faces can be constructed by chamfering the axial edges of a pyritohedron. This occurs in pyrite crystals.

Chamfered octahedron

In geometry, the chamfered octahedron is a convex polyhedron constructed from the rhombic dodecahedron by truncating the 8 (order 3) vertices.

It can also be called a tritruncated rhombic dodecahedron, a truncation of the order-3 vertices of the rhombic dodecahedron.

The 8 vertices are truncated such that all edges are equal length. The original 12 rhombic faces become flattened hexagons, and the truncated vertices become triangles.

The hexagonal faces are equilateral but not regular.

Chamfered dodecahedron

The chamfered dodecahedron is a convex polyhedron with 80 vertices, 120 edges, and 42 faces: 30 hexagons and 12 pentagons. It is constructed as a chamfer of a regular dodecahedron. The pentagons are reduced in size and new hexagonal faces are added in place of all the original edges. Its dual is the pentakis icosidodecahedron.

It is also inaccurately called a truncated rhombic triacontahedron, although that name rather suggests a rhombicosidodecahedron. It can more accurately be called a pentatruncated rhombic triacontahedron because only the order-5 vertices are truncated.

Chamfered icosahedron 

In geometry, the chamfered icosahedron is a convex polyhedron constructed from the rhombic triacontahedron by truncating the 20 order-3 vertices. The hexagonal faces can be made equilateral but not regular.

It can also be called a tritruncated rhombic triacontahedron, a truncation of the order-3 vertices of the rhombic triacontahedron.

Chamfered regular tilings

Relation to Goldberg polyhedra 
The chamfer operation applied in series creates progressively larger polyhedra with new hexagonal faces replacing edges from the previous one. The chamfer operator transforms GP(m,n) to GP(2m,2n).

A regular polyhedron, GP(1,0), create a Goldberg polyhedra sequence: GP(1,0), GP(2,0), GP(4,0), GP(8,0), GP(16,0)...

The truncated octahedron or truncated icosahedron, GP(1,1) creates a Goldberg sequence: GP(1,1), GP(2,2), GP(4,4), GP(8,8)....

A truncated tetrakis hexahedron or pentakis dodecahedron, GP(3,0), creates a Goldberg sequence: GP(3,0), GP(6,0), GP(12,0)...

Chamfered polytopes and honeycombs
Like the expansion operation, chamfer can be applied to any dimension. For polygons, it triples the number of vertices. For polychora, new cells are created around the original edges. The cells are prisms, containing two copies of the original face, with pyramids augmented onto the prism sides.

See also 
 Conway polyhedron notation
 Near-miss Johnson solid
Cantellation (geometry)

References 

 Joseph D. Clinton, Clinton’s Equal Central Angle Conjecture 

 Antoine Deza, Michel Deza, Viatcheslav Grishukhin, Fullerenes and coordination polyhedra versus half-cube embeddings, 1998 PDF  (p. 72 Fig. 26. Chamfered tetrahedron)
.

External links
 Chamfered Tetrahedron
 Chamfered Solids
 Vertex- and edge-truncation of the Platonic and Archimedean solids leading to vertex-transitive polyhedra Livio Zefiro
 VRML polyhedral generator (Conway polyhedron notation)
 VRML model Chamfered cube
 3.2.7. Systematic numbering for (C80-Ih) [5,6] fullerene
 Fullerene C80
   (Number 7 -Ih)
 
 How to make a chamfered cube

Goldberg polyhedra
Polyhedra
Mathematical notation